Rescue Records was created by P.O.D. drummer Wuv Bernardo's father and Sonny Sandoval's uncle, Noah Bernardo Sr. It is most notable for being the label that started multi-platinum band P.O.D. and is currently distributed by Syntax Creative a distributor owned by a former artist of Rescue Records.

Divisions
Root Records

Active
FASEDOWN (currently on Hemrocrit Records)
P.O.D. (currently on T-Boy Records)
Tonéx
Dj Skillspinz
The Pride

Disbanded
Point Of Recognition

Hiatus or Unknown
Dogwood
N.I.V. 
JeremiahDirt
Fros'T
Unity Klan
E-Roc
Sackcloth Fashion
Nailed Promise
Ancient of Days
Skratchline
BLAH (Born Lost And Hopeless)

Former
Xodus

Compilations
Urban Soldiers
Sonic Imperial
"Now the tables have turned" 3 way split compilation released on Rescue Records, bands featured are: Point of Recognition, Cast in Stone, and Torn in Two

References 

Christian record labels